Goransson's Boy (Swedish: Göranssons pojke) is a 1941 Swedish drama film directed by and starring Weyler Hildebrand and also featuring Eric Abrahamsson, Hilda Borgström and Emy Hagman. It was shot at the Råsunda Studios in Stockholm. The film's sets were designed by the art director Arne Åkermark.

Cast
 Weyler Hildebrand as 	Julius Göransson
 Tom Olsson as 	Pelle
 Eric Abrahamsson as Sudden
 Hilda Borgström as 	Aunt Brink
 Gaby Stenberg as 	Karin Brodin
 Emy Hagman as 	Anna Fagerlund
 Sigge Fürst as 	Skrot-Johan
 Magnus Kesster as 	Snobben
 Kotti Chave as 	Balalajka
 Carl Ström as 	Prison Chaplain	
 Gunnar Sjöberg as 	Göran Bryhme, Pelle's father 
 Elsa Ebbesen as 	Göransson's mother 
 Wiktor Andersson as MC at the boxing
 Douglas Håge as Foreman
 John Elfström as 	Policeman interrogating Göransson
 Carl Ericson as 	Street sweeper 
 Arthur Fischer as Wholesaler 
 Helge Kihlberg as 	Prisoner 
 Ivar Wahlgren as 	Policeman 
 Aurore Palmgren as 	Quarreling woman 
 Stig Olin as Young man at Norr Mälarstrand 
 Christian Bratt as 	Young man at Norr Mälarstrand
 John Norrman as Old man at the Bachelor's Hotel 
 Anders Frithiof as Warden at the prison

References

Bibliography 
 Holmstrom, John. The Moving Picture Boy: An International Encyclopaedia from 1895 to 1995. Michael Russell, 1996.

External links 
 

1941 films
Swedish drama films
1941 drama films
1940s Swedish-language films
Films directed by Weyler Hildebrand
Films set in Stockholm
1940s Swedish films